The Battle of Cartagena was a naval battle fought on 3 September 1643, during the Thirty Years' War off Cabo de Gata near Cartagena, Spain. 

After a series of victories in 1641 and 1642 the French Navy dominated the Western Mediterranean Sea. France was also in control of most of Catalonia after the Catalan Revolt. At that time, the Spanish Navy did not dare to show itself off the Catalan coast.

In 1643 the French admiral Jean Armand de Maillé-Brézé sailed south, to search for and destroy the Spanish fleet to extend the dominance of the French Navy in the Mediterranean.
He found a fleet of Dunkirkers under Joos Petersen, ships from Naples and a squadron from the Mar Oceano fleet under Martín Carlos de Mencos.

On 3 September at 7:00 AM Maillé-Brézé attacked with favorable winds and dispersed the enemy fleet. He sank 2 galleons and captured 2 others, while the rest of the Spanish fleet retreated into the port of Cartagena. Here 8 more ships were beyond repair and sank.

The port was closed by the Duke of Fernandina and no Spanish ship left the harbour for more than a year.

All commerce between Spain and Italy was thus made impossible. The victory was short-lived for the French, however, as Spanish dominance in the region returned when the French fleet declined after the death of Cardinal Richelieu.

References
 Henri Martin, Histoire de France, depuis les temps les plus reculés jusqu'en 1789, 1858
 Léon Guérin, Histoire maritime de France, 1851

Battles of the Thirty Years' War
Battle
Naval battles involving Spain
Naval battles involving France
Battles in the Region of Murcia
Cartagena, Battle of